Lewis Norton (1855–1893) was an American academic who introduced the first four-year undergraduate chemical engineering program while teaching at Massachusetts Institute of Technology in 1888.

References

External links
 

1855 births
1893 deaths
American chemical engineers